Valley Power may refer to;
 Drayton Valley Power, a biomass power station in Alberta, Canada
 Valley Power Peaking Facility in Victoria, Australia
 Valley Power Plant in Wisconsin, USA
 Valley Power, Inc., an electrical wholesale supplier in Willow Grove, Pennsylvania